The Spanish River is a former fresh-water stream which once flowed through Boca Raton, Florida. It was originally known as "Boca Raton's Lagoon" but settlers renamed it the "Old Spanish River." It has been channeled into the Intracoastal Waterway. People joke that "no one in town can find it" but in fact the stream bed is still visible in Spanish River Park. There are several establishments in the area that bear the name of the once-flowing river, including a high school, a church, and a library.

References 

Boca Raton, Florida
Rivers of Florida
Bodies of water of Palm Beach County, Florida